James Smith (28 January 1891 – 7 September 1971) was a New Zealand cricketer. He played six first-class matches for Otago between 1914 and 1922.

See also
 List of Otago representative cricketers

References

External links
 

1891 births
1971 deaths
New Zealand cricketers
Otago cricketers
Cricketers from Dunedin